Keith LeWayne Smith (born March 9, 1964) is an American former shooting guard who played in the National Basketball Association (NBA).

Biography
Smith was born in Flint, Michigan and graduated from West Covina High School in West Covina, California. He played college basketball at Loyola Marymount University. He was awarded All-Conference First-Team Honors in 1984, 1985, and 1986 while attending Loyola Marymount University.

Smith was drafted by the Milwaukee Bucks in the second round of the 1986 NBA Draft and spent the following season with the team. He played one season in the NBA.

In 2000 Smith was inducted into the Athletic Hall of Fame at Loyola Marymount University.

Smith is currently a head coach for Hamady High School's lady hawk basketball team where he has won back to back class c state titles in 2009 and 2010.

References

External links
 
 Basketball=Reference.Com
 The Official Site of Loyola Marymount

1964 births
Living people
Albany Patroons players
American men's basketball players
Basketball players from Flint, Michigan
La Crosse Catbirds players
Loyola Marymount Lions men's basketball players
Milwaukee Bucks draft picks
Milwaukee Bucks players
Shooting guards